Senior Year is a 2022 American comedy film directed by Alex Hardcastle (in his feature film directorial debut) from a screenplay by Andrew Knauer, Arthur Pielli, and Brandon Scott Jones. The film stars Rebel Wilson (who also produced) as a 37-year-old woman who awakens from a 20-year coma and decides to go back to high school to earn her diploma. Sam Richardson, Zoë Chao, Mary Holland, Justin Hartley, Chris Parnell, Angourie Rice, Michael Cimino, Jeremy Ray Taylor, Jones, and Alicia Silverstone also star. The film was released on May 13, 2022, by Netflix, and received mixed reviews from critics.

Plot
In 1999, after a disastrous birthday party at the local "cool" spot, Rock N Bowl, with her friends Seth and Martha, 14 year-old Australian immigrant Stephanie Conway decides she wants to be one of "the populars". She spends the next few years giving herself a makeover, becoming cheer squad captain, dating popular boy Blaine, and becoming one of the most popular girls by senior year.

In 2002, Stephanie plans to win the title of prom queen in hopes of becoming like Deanna Russo, an alumna of her high school who got married after graduation, and now lives in an expensive mansion. She lives with her widowed father and is still friends with Martha and Seth, who secretly has a crush on her. Stephanie has regular disagreements over prom preparations with Blaine's ex-girlfriend Tiffany, who feels threatened by the prospect of Stephanie winning the prom queen title. At a cheer performance, Tiffany convinces her friends to sabotage Stephanie's landing, severely injuring her and putting her into a coma.

Twenty years later, in 2022, Stephanie, now 37, wakes from her coma. Her father and Martha, now principal and cheerleading coach at Harding High, take her home. On the way, driving past Deanna Russo's old house, Stephanie sees that the now-married Tiffany and Blaine reside there. With reluctant support from her father and Martha, Stephanie goes back to high school to finish her senior year, where she learns that Seth is now the librarian, and the positions of prom king and queen have been abolished due to student complaints. Additionally, Tiffany and Blaine's daughter Bri is the most popular girl at school and has a huge social media following. The cheerleaders are no longer the popular students and are forced to perform bland, sanitized routines with no dancing.

Stephanie works to regain her former popularity through social media, finally succeeding after a risqué cheer routine she choreographs without Martha's permission goes viral at a pep rally. The next day, she is confronted by Martha, who tells her that she and Seth felt abandoned when Stephanie became popular back in high school. Stephanie decides to attend a showing of Deep Impact with Seth, and they get closer after goading Tiffany into getting kicked out of the theater for being disruptive. Afterwards, they have drinks at the Rock N Bowl and Stephanie confesses that she wants to be elected prom queen so badly because she wants to make her late mother proud.

Tiffany uses Bri's influence at school to get the prom king and queen contest reinstated and invites everyone at school except Stephanie to a prom afterparty at their house. Stephanie decides to host her own afterparty at Martha's lake house without her knowledge. Seth agrees to go to prom with Stephanie but is hurt when he sees Blaine attempt to kiss her, not knowing that Blaine was drunk and tried to force himself on her. Bri's boyfriend Lance becomes prom king, and although Tiffany rigs the vote so Bri will win, Bri drops out so that Stephanie is the prom queen. As Stephanie and Lance share the prom king and queen dance, the school rallies around her. Bri tells everyone to attend Stephanie's afterparty, which is successful until Tiffany gets the police to shut it down. Martha angrily confronts Stephanie for using her lake house without asking.

On the way home from the party, Stephanie realizes her Lyft driver is a middle-aged Deanna Russo. Deanna reveals that before she turned 30, her husband divorced her after deciding to leave her for a 21-year-old woman. Since she did not have a college degree, she was never able to build a life for herself and now works several part-time jobs while struggling to pay for community college. Deanna tells Stephanie that becoming prom queen did not give her a perfect life or fix all of her problems. Bri arrives home, furious that Tiffany called the police on Stephanie's party, and points out that Tiffany did not even ask if she was okay or if she had been arrested. Bri points out that both her father and mother are miserable together and forces her to apologize to Stephanie. Stephanie accepts Tiffany's apology and encourages her to focus more on her daughter instead of keeping up appearances.

Stephanie tears down her popularity board and contemplates skipping the graduation ceremony, but her father convinces her to attend. Streaming an apology to her followers and friends, she promises to be her true self from now on. At graduation, her friends and family secretly organize the cheer routine from Stephanie's senior year. She makes up with Martha, finally kisses Seth, and welcomes Tiffany to join them on stage as she finally gets to pull off the move that she never got to do twenty years earlier.

Cast
 Rebel Wilson as Stephanie "Steph" Conway
 Angourie Rice as teen Stephanie Conway
 Sam Richardson as Seth Novacelik
 Zaire Adams as teen Seth Novacelik
 Zoë Chao as Tiffany "Tiff" Blanchette-Balbo
Ana Yi Puig as teen Tiffany Blanchette
 Mary Holland as Martha "Marth" Reiser
 Molly Brown as teen Martha Reiser
 Justin Hartley as Blaine Balbo
Tyler Barnhardt as teen Blaine Balbo
 Chris Parnell as Jim Conway
 Lucy Taylor as Lydia Conway
 Michael Cimino as Lance Harrison
 Jeremy Ray Taylor as Neil Chudd
 Brandon Scott Jones as Mr. T
 Alicia Silverstone as Deanna Russo
 Joshua Colley as Yaz
 Jade Bender as Britney Jean "Bri" Balbo / "@BriLuvs"
 Avantika Vandanapu as Janet Singh

Additionally, Merrick McCartha appears as Principal Young, and Steve Aoki appears as himself.

Production 
In June 2021, Alicia Silverstone joined the cast. In July 2021, Jade Bender, Michael Cimino, Jeremy Ray Taylor, Avantika, Joshua Colley, newcomer Ana Yi Puig, Molly Brown, Zaire Adams, and Tyler Barnhardt were added to the cast.

Principal photography began in Atlanta, Georgia, on May 24, 2021, during the COVID-19 pandemic. Filming was completed by July 2021.

Reception 
The movie has received some negative reviews.  

Screen Rant criticized Senior Years over-reliance on millennial nostalgia at the expense of story and character development, saying "The issue is Senior Year gets so caught up with referencing the early aughts that it forgets to have any depth to its story." In a two-star review, Christy Lemire of RogerEbert.com commended the performance of Angourie Rice, citing that "she accurately channels Wilson's sly, deadpan delivery". The Guardian criticized the film's humor, calling it "an R-rated comedy that wants to be both sweet and salty, a balance it never manages to perfect".

References

External links
 

2022 comedy films
2022 directorial debut films
2020s English-language films
2020s high school films
American comedy films
American high school films
Cheerleading films
English-language Netflix original films
Films about proms
Films impacted by the COVID-19 pandemic
Films set in 1999
Films set in 2002
Films set in 2022
Films set in Maryland
Films shot in Atlanta
Paramount Pictures films
Paramount Players films
2020s American films